"Days" is the fourteenth single by Japanese recording artist Alisa Mizuki. It was released on November 19, 1997 as the fifth and final single from Mizuki's third compilation album Fiore II. It was also included on Mizuki's fifth studio album Innocence. The title track was written and produced by former Every Little Thing keyboardist Mitsuru Igarashi and served as theme song for the second season of the Fuji TV drama Nurse no Oshigoto, starring Mizuki herself. "Days" is Mizuki's first release under the record label Avex Tune.

Chart performance 
"Days" debuted on the Oricon Weekly Singles chart at number 14 with 28,020 copies sold in its first week. It stayed in the top 30, at number 24, on its second week, with 18,660 copies sold. The single charted for nine weeks and has sold a total of 101,120 copies.

Track listing

Charts and sales

References 

1997 singles
Alisa Mizuki songs
Japanese television drama theme songs
Songs written by Mitsuru Igarashi
1997 songs